Don't Cry Wolf may refer to:

 "Don't Cry Wolf" (song), a 1977 song by the Damned
 Don't Cry Wolf (album), a 1986 album by London
 Don't Cry Wolf (film), a 2003 Swedish comedy film

See also 
 Cry Wolf (disambiguation)